Jack Earle Haley (born July 14, 1961) is an American actor and director. His earliest roles included Moocher in Breaking Away (1979) and Kelly Leak in The Bad News Bears (1976), The Bad News Bears in Breaking Training (1977) and The Bad News Bears Go to Japan (1978). After spending many years as a producer and director of television commercials, he revived his acting career with a supporting role in All the King's Men (2006). This was followed by his performance in Little Children (2006), for which he was nominated for the Academy Award for Best Supporting Actor.

His subsequent notable roles include the antihero Rorschach in Watchmen (2009), horror icon Freddy Krueger in the remake of A Nightmare on Elm Street (2010), and Grewishka, a cyborg criminal in Alita: Battle Angel (2019). He  played Odin Quincannon in the first season (2016) of Preacher and The Terror in the first season (2016–18) of The Tick.

Early life
Haley was born and raised in the Northridge neighborhood of Los Angeles, the son of Haven Earle "Bud" Haley, a radio show host/disc jockey and actor. His mother is Iris D Douglas.

Career
Haley has appeared in numerous films, including John Schlesinger's The Day of the Locust, Damnation Alley, and Losin' It, as well as guest roles on TV. A well-known child actor, he starred as Kelly Leak in the comedy The Bad News Bears, as well as the sequels The Bad News Bears in Breaking Training and The Bad News Bears Go to Japan.

He played Moocher in Peter Yates's acclaimed 1979 film Breaking Away and later in the short-lived TV series of the same name. Throughout the 1970s, he often played tough, angry, pimply, long-haired misfits; although in his feature debut, the offbeat 1972 film The Outside Man, he played Eric, a boy so desperately lonely that he tries to impress the mob assassin holding him and his mother (Georgia Engel) hostage. Haley also shot a pilot for an American version of the popular British comedy The Young Ones titled Oh, No! Not THEM!. In 1974 he played Norm, a misfit kid, in the 12th episode of the Saturday morning children's show Shazam! 

Haley's acting career went dormant during most of the 1990s and early 2000s, when he moved to San Antonio. He eventually turned to directing, finding success as a producer and director of television commercials.

With the recommendation of Sean Penn, Haley returned to acting in 2006, first appearing in Steven Zaillian's  All the King's Men alongside Penn as Sugar Boy, his bodyguard, before giving a critically acclaimed performance as a recently paroled sex offender in Todd Field's Little Children. He stated that his preparation for the role was greatly influenced by the relationship shared between his mother and his brother True, who battled a heroin addiction before he died of an overdose.  Haley was nominated for an Academy Award for Best Supporting Actor for this portrayal and in 2007 was invited to join the Academy of Motion Picture Arts and Sciences.

Haley owns a production company, JEH Productions, in San Antonio. In 2008, he appeared in Semi-Pro and starred in Winged Creatures with Kate Beckinsale, Guy Pearce and Dakota Fanning. He also stars in Zack Snyder's 2009 adaptation of the Alan Moore graphic novel Watchmen as Rorschach, a masked vigilante working to find the identity of a costumed hero killer, a role which earned him praise from many reviewers. The film also reunited him with Little Children co-star Patrick Wilson who played Nite Owl II, Rorschach's former partner. Also in 2010, Haley appeared in Shutter Island, directed by Martin Scorsese, as a patient of a hospital for the criminally insane.

In 2010, Haley played Freddy Krueger in the A Nightmare on Elm Street remake. He signed to play the role in a sequel, which was not produced.

Haley has dismissed rumors that he accompanied Johnny Depp to auditions for Wes Craven's original A Nightmare on Elm Street (1984) to audition for the role Depp was eventually cast in. Haley auditioned for the role of the film's antagonist, Freddy Krueger, but ended up losing out to Robert Englund for the 1984 version of the film.

Haley was a series regular on Human Target as Guerrero, an ally of the main character, Christopher Chance. The series premiered on January 17, 2010 on Fox, and ran for two seasons before being cancelled in May 2011.

He played Willie Loomis in the 2012 film adaptation of Dark Shadows, directed by Tim Burton, and played Confederate States Vice President Alexander H. Stephens in Lincoln, directed by Steven Spielberg. He played the supervillain "The Terror" in Amazon's re-boot of The Tick.

Personal life
Haley's first marriage was to Sherry Vaughan in 1979. He has two children: a son, Christopher (born 1986), and a daughter, Olivia (born 1998), by his second wife, Jennifer Haley. He married his third wife, Amelia Cruz, in 2004. They live in San Antonio. Haley holds black belts in Kenpo and Taekwondo.

Filmography

Film

Television

Theatre

Video games

References

External links

 
 
 

1961 births
Living people
American male child actors
American male film actors
American male television actors
American male video game actors
American male voice actors
Male actors from Los Angeles
Male actors from San Antonio
People from Northridge, Los Angeles
20th-century American male actors
21st-century American male actors